Joseph Michael Sheridan (27 November 1914 – 30 September 2000) was an Irish politician, originally with Fine Gael but for most of his career an independent.

Sheridan came from Colmcille in County Longford, and had three brothers and two sisters. He moved to Westmeath, first to Kilbeggan and then to Mullingar. An auctioneer and farmer by profession, he was elected to Westmeath County Council, and then to Seanad Éireann by the Agricultural Panel at a by-election on 14 May 1956. He was re-elected at the 1957 Seanad election, this time by the Labour Panel. 

He was elected to Dáil Éireann as an independent Teachta Dála (TD) for the Longford–Westmeath constituency at the 1961 general election. In spite of his Fine Gael background, he supported the minority Fianna Fáil government. He was re-elected at the 1965, 1969, 1973 and 1977 general elections. He concentrated on local constituency needs, with the electoral slogan "Vote for Joe, the Man you Know." He retired at the 1981 general election.

Sheridan had five sons and four daughters, one of whom, Kathy Sheridan, is a journalist with The Irish Times.

References

1914 births
2000 deaths
Fine Gael politicians
Independent TDs
Irish auctioneers
Irish farmers
Members of the 8th Seanad
Members of the 9th Seanad
Members of the 17th Dáil
Members of the 18th Dáil
Members of the 19th Dáil
Members of the 20th Dáil
Members of the 21st Dáil
Politicians from County Longford
Independent members of Seanad Éireann